Outlaw Queen is a 1957 American western film directed by Herbert S. Greene and starring Andrea King, Harry James and Robert Clarke.

Synopsis
Christina, the daughter of Greek immigrants tours the West with her uncle in a sharpshooting act. After losing their earnings one night in a game of poker in Conway's saloon, they win it back again by shouting out their opponents cards in Greek. Christina opens her own rival saloon which is soon a huge success, and before long has built up a business empire including a ranch. Conways's resentment leads him to try and destroy her.

Cast
 Andrea King as Christina
 Harry James as 	Rick Mason
 Robert Clarke as 	John Andrews
 James Harakas as Uncle Jim 
 Andy Ladas as Andy Trinas
 Kenne Duncan as Sheriff
 I. Stanford Jolley as 	Conway
 William Murphy as 	Brandon
 Vince Barnett as Gambler
 Harold Peary as 	Bartender 
 John Heldring as 	Bank Manager

References

Bibliography
 Craig, Rob. Ed Wood, Mad Genius: A Critical Study of the Films. McFarland, 2009.

External links
 

1957 films
1957 Western (genre) films
American Western (genre) films
1950s English-language films
1950s American films